is a passenger railway station on the Kawagoe Line located in Nishi-ku, Saitama, Saitama Prefecture, Japan, operated by East Japan Railway Company (JR East).

Lines
Services operate every 20 minutes during the daytime.

Station layout
The station has two side platforms serving two tracks, with an elevated station building located above the platforms. The station is staffed.

Platforms

History
The station opened on 14 March 2009.

Passenger statistics
In fiscal 2019, the station was used by an average of 11,158 passengers daily (boarding passengers only). The passenger figures (boarding passengers only) for previous years are as shown below.

Surrounding area
 Saitama Nishi Ward Office
 Ōmiya Nishi Police Station
 Saitama Nishi Fire Station
 Aoba-en Gardens

Schools
 Nishi-Ōmiya Junior High School
 Sashiōgi Junior High School
 Miyamae Elementary School
 Sashiōgi Elementary School
 Himawari Special School

See also
 List of railway stations in Japan

References

External links

 

Railway stations in Saitama Prefecture
Railway stations in Japan opened in 2009
Kawagoe Line
Stations of East Japan Railway Company
Railway stations in Saitama (city)